Klāvs Čavars (born February 11, 1996) is a Latvian professional basketball player for Start Lublin of the PLK. The 2.08 m (6 ft 10 in) Center played six seasons for VEF Rīga.

Professional career

VEF Rīga 
Čavars first joined the VEF Rīga and played in the 2012–13 season. Although loaned to other teams, Čavars played a total of six seasons for VEF Rīga. Čavars' career high was during the 2013–14 season, playing 4 games and averaging 9.0 points and 9.5 rebounds. During the 2018–19 season, Cavars finished with 23 games played and averaged 2.5 points, 0.2 assists and 2.2 rebounds. This was his second career low with the team after the 2018–19 season finishing with an average of 6.6 points, 5.2 rebounds and 0.9 assists.

BK Liepājas 
Čavars played one season for the BK Liepājas. During the 2015–16 season he played in both the Latvian Basketball League and Baltic Basketball League, in a total of 54 combined games (42 in LBL, 12 in BBL).

BK Ventspils
Čavars played for the BK Ventspils during the 2019–20 season. He played for 20 minutes in 20 games and averaged 11.3 points, 7.4 rebounds and 1.8 assists per game.

Tsmoki-Minsk
On June 10, 2020, he has signed with Tsmoki-Minsk of the VTB United League.

Astoria Bydgoszcz
On July 23, 2021, he has signed with Astoria Bydgoszcz of the PLK.

Start Lublin
On July 23, 2022, he has signed with Start Lublin of the PLK.

National team career 
Čavars is currently scheduled to represent the Latvia men's national basketball team in the upcoming EuroBasket 2021.

References

External links
FIBA Europe Profile
ProBallers.com Profile
Basketball.RealGM.com Profile

1996 births
Living people
Astoria Bydgoszcz players
BC Tsmoki-Minsk players
BK Liepājas Lauvas players
BK VEF Rīga players
BK Ventspils players
İstanbul Teknik Üniversitesi B.K. players
Latvian expatriate basketball people in Turkey
Latvian men's basketball players
Start Lublin players